Tae-yong is a Korean masculine given name. Its meaning differs based on the hanja used to write each syllable of the name. There are 20 hanja with the reading "tae" and 24 hanja with the reading "yong" on the South Korean government's official list of hanja which may be registered for use in given names. Additionally, there is one character with the reading "ryong" which may also be written and pronounced "yong" in South Korea.

Notable people with this name include:
Cho Tae-yong (born 1956), South Korean diplomat
Kim Tae-yong (born 1969), South Korean film director
Shin Tae-yong (born 1970), South Korean footballer
Kim Taeyong (writer) (born 1974), South Korean writer
Kim Tae-yong (director, born 1987), South Korean film director
Lee Tae-yong (born 1995), South Korean singer, member of boy bands NCT and SuperM

See also
List of Korean given names

References

Korean masculine given names